CSSE can refer to:
The Canadian Society of Safety Engineering
Center for Systems Science and Engineering at Johns Hopkins University
Chicken Soup for the Soul (Nasdaq: CSSE), American mass media company
Computer Science and Software Engineering, a designation used at some universities for the department of the same name
The Consortium for Selective Schools in Essex